Hadar (also Romanized as Ḩadar) is a village in Sokmanabad Rural District, Safayyeh District, Khoy County, West Azerbaijan Province, Iran. At the 2006 census, its population was 223, in 34 families.

References 

Populated places in Khoy County